Ogholbeyk-e Duzkand (also Romanized as Ogholbeyk-e Dūzkand; also known as Oghlībeyk and Ogholbeyk) is a village in Qaleh Juq Rural District, Anguran District, Mahneshan County, Zanjan Province, Iran. At the 2006 census, its population was 480, in 109 families.

References 

Populated places in Mahneshan County